The Assistant Secretary of the Treasury for Financial Institutions is an official in the United States Department of the Treasury who is the head of the Office of Financial Institutions. The office "helps formulate policy on financial institutions and government-sponsored enterprises, cybersecurity and critical infrastructure protection."  The post is currently held by Graham Steele, with President Joe Biden nominating him to lead the office on July 19, 2021.

The office was formed in 1976 by Secretary of the Treasury William E. Simon as the Assistant Secretary for Capital Markets and Debt Management.

According to U.S. statute, there are ten Assistant Secretaries of the Treasury appointed by the President of the United States with the advice and consent of the United States Senate.  The Assistant Secretary of the Treasury for Financial Institutions reports to the Under Secretary of the Treasury for Domestic Finance, who in turn reports to the United States Secretary of the Treasury and the United States Deputy Secretary of the Treasury.

List of Assistant Secretaries of the Treasury for Financial Institutions

See also
 Assistant Secretary of the Treasury

References